Steve Moore may refer to:
 Steve Moore (writer) (born 1960), writer and economic policy analyst
 Steve Moore (ice hockey) (born 1978), former National Hockey League player
 Steve Moore (playwright), American playwright
 Steve Moore (cartoonist) (born 1965), American cartoonist, screenwriter, and producer
 Steve Moore (comics) (1949–2014), British comics writer
 Steve Moore (comedian) (1954–2014), American stand-up comedian
 Steve Moore (American football) (1960–1989), American football player
 Steve Moore (footballer) (born 1969), former Chester City footballer
 Steve Moore (racing driver) (born 1958), American former NASCAR driver
 Steve Moore (musician), keyboardist and bass guitarist of Zombi 
 Steve Moore (basketball) (born 1952), college basketball head coach
 Steve Moore (rugby union) (born 1972), Wales rugby union player
 R. Stevie Moore, American singer/songwriter and musician

See also
 Steven Moore (disambiguation)
 Stephen Moore (disambiguation)